Sir James Jamieson Thorburn   (1864 – 14 September 1929) was a British colonial administrator, Governor of the  Gold Coast (today's Ghana) from 1910 to 1912.

Life
James Thorborn was the son of William Thorburn of Edinburgh and Ruth, widow of R. Bertram Parsey. Educated at Edinburgh Collegiate School, he entered the Ceylon Civil Service in 1886. Transferred to Southern Nigeria in 1905, he was Lieutenant-Governor of Southern Nigeria and Lagos from 1906 to 1910. He succeeded John Rodger as Governor of the Gold Coast on 21 November 1910. He retired on 29 June 1912, to be succeeded by Hugh Clifford. Sir Philip Crampton Smyly served under Thorburn.

References

1864 births
1929 deaths
Companions of the Order of St Michael and St George
Governors of the Gold Coast (British colony)
People educated at Edinburgh Collegiate School